Cristian Zaragoza (born May 24, 2003) is an American soccer player who currently plays for Chattanooga Red Wolves in USL League One on a USL academy contract.

Career

Youth
Zaragoza played high school soccer at Dalton High School, before later playing club soccer with Dalton Red Wolves in 2019, where he stayed for three seasons.

On April 2, 2021, Zaragoza signed a USL academy contract with USL League One side Chattanooga Red Wolves. He made his debut for the club on June 20, 2021, appearing as an injury-time substitute during a 3–2 win against North Carolina FC.

College
In 2021, Zaragoza committed to play college soccer at North Carolina State University.

References

External links
 

Living people
2003 births
American soccer players
Association football defenders
Chattanooga Red Wolves SC players
NC State Wolfpack men's soccer players
People from Dalton, Georgia
Soccer players from Georgia (U.S. state)
USL League One players